Serviceability may refer to:

Serviceability (structure)
Serviceability (computer)
Serviceability (telecommunications)
Serviceability (banking)